David L. Bach is an American financial author, television personality, motivational speaker, entrepreneur and founder of FinishRich.com. Bach, is best known for his Finish Rich Book Series and Automatic Millionaire Series of motivational financial books under the Finish Rich Brand. He has written 12 books since 1998 with over seven million copies in print.  

Eleven of Bach's books have been national bestsellers, including nine consecutive New York Times bestsellers, two of which were consecutive #1 New York Times bestsellers (The Automatic Millionaire and Start Late, Finish Rich).  Bach has had four of his books Smart Women Finish Rich, Smart Couples Finish Rich, The Automatic Millionaire and The Finish Rich Workbook  appear simultaneously on the Wall Street Journal, BusinessWeek, and USA Today bestseller lists.   Eleven of Bach's books have been published from Random House (Broadway Books).  

Bach's first book Smart Women Finish Rich was published in 1998, and appeared on the bestseller lists for a decade.  His most recent book Debt Free For Life (2011) was published by Crown Business Books, and appeared simultaneously on the New York Times, Wall Street Journal and USA Today bestseller lists.

Bach has appeared regularly on television dispensing his financial advice since 1994. His first appearance on television took place in San Francisco, on local cable channel BayTV — where he was "The Money Doctor", and answered personal financial questions.  

He was a regular contributor to The Today Show, appearing weekly on the Money 911 Segments. He also has contributed to CNN American Morning, CNBC, Fox Business, ABC Good Money, and The Oprah Winfrey Show.  He has appeared on The Oprah Winfrey Show over six times including the shows "How to become an Automatic Millionaire" (2004), "How to become an Automatic Millionaire Couple" (2004) and "Oprah's Debt Diet Series" (2006).  Bach has appeared on CBS's The Early Show, NBC's Weekend Today, CNN's Larry King Live, ABC's Live with Regis and Kelly, and ABC's The View.

Bach has written, produced and hosted two public television specials, Smart Women Finish Rich and The Automatic Millionaire which aired nationally. Smart Women Finish Rich was produced by Connecticut Public Television (1998) and The Automatic Millionaire  by Chicago Public Television (2006). He has hosted two radio shows, Finish Rich with David Bach (Sirius Satellite Radio) and The Finish Rich Minute (Westwood One).

 Early life and education 
David Bach was born in Oakland, California in 1966 to Bobbi and Martin Bach. He earned a Bachelor of Arts in Social Sciences and Communication at the University of Southern California in 1990, and was honored by USC as a distinguished alumnus in 2010.

 Early career 
Prior to founding FinishRich Media, LLC, he was senior vice president of Morgan Stanley and a partner of The Bach Group, (1993 to 2001).

 Writing 
David Bach is the bestselling author of twelve books, including two consecutive #1New York Times bestsellers, Start Late, Finish Rich and The Automatic Millionaire as well as the national and international bestsellers Debt Free For Life, Fight For Your Money, Go Green, Live Rich, The Automatic Millionaire Homeowner, Smart Women Finish Rich, Smart Couples Finish Rich, The Finish Rich Workbook, and The Automatic Millionaire Workbook.Smart Women Finish Rich (1999).Smart Couples Finish Rich (2001)The Finish Rich Workbook (2003)The Finish Rich Dictionary (2003)The Automatic Millionaire (2005)The Automatic Millionaire Workbook (2005)Start Late, Finish Rich (2006)The Automatic Millionaire Homeowner (2005)Go Green, Live Rich (2008)Fight For Your Money (2009)Start Over, Finish Rich (2010)Debt Free For Life (2011)The Latte Factor (2019)Media
Bach is regularly featured in the media. He has appeared over six times on The Oprah Winfrey Show and every Wednesday he gives financial advice on The Today Show Money 911 segment. He has also appeared on many other nationally syndicated shows including: Weekend Today, CNN's Larry King Live, ABC's Live with Regis and Kelly, The View, CBS's Early Show, ABC News, ABC's Good Money, Fox News, and CNBC.

He has been featured in many major publications, including The New York Times, BusinessWeek, USA Today, People, Reader's Digest, Time, Financial Times, The Washington Post, The Wall Street Journal, Los Angeles Times, San Francisco Chronicle, Working Woman, Glamour and Family Circle. He has been a contributor to Redbook Magazine, Smart Money Magazine'', Oprah.com, Yahoo Finance, Forbes.com and AOL Money.

Charitable causes
David Bach is involved with various causes including serving on the board for Habitat for Humanity, New York.  Bach has donated proceeds from his books to Habitat for Humanity - New York City, Waterkeeper Alliance and Charity: water. He also co-founded Makers of Memories, a charity organization dedicated to helping women and children who are victims of domestic violence.

Personal life
Bach currently resides in Florence, Italy with his family.

References

Living people
American financial businesspeople
American finance and investment writers
American self-help writers
1966 births
Businesspeople from Oakland, California
University of Southern California alumni
Writers from Oakland, California